Evelin Hagoel (born 27 January 1961) is an Israeli actress. She appeared in more than twenty films since 2001.

Selected filmography

References

External links 

1961 births
Living people
Israeli film actresses
Israeli people of Moroccan-Jewish descent
20th-century Moroccan Jews
Moroccan emigrants to Israel